Gerhard Bock (6 March 1879 – 6 May 1945) was a German sport shooter who competed in the 1912 Summer Olympics. In 1912 he was a member of the German team which finished seventh in the 30 metre team military pistol competition. In the 50 metre pistol event he finished 44th.

Bock was a noted writer on the subject of firearms and he consulted with various makers on the design of the 50 meter free pistol.

References

Bock, Gerhard.  Moderne Faustfeuerwaffen und ihr Gebrauch.  (Modern Handguns and their Use) 1911 (and at least two editions more)

Bock, Gerhard and Weigel, Wolfgang.  Handbuch der Faustfeuerwaffen.   The work was edited by W. Weigel after the 4th edition of the book “Modern handguns and their use" by Bock and the 2nd edition of the book “Ballistics of handguns" by Wolfgang Weigel.

Bock, Gerhard.  Die Kleinkaliber-Büchse als Sport- und Übungswaffe.  (The small caliber rifle as a sporting and training weapon)  Neumann, Neudamm, 1923.

External links
List of German sport shooters

1879 births
1945 deaths
German male sport shooters
ISSF pistol shooters
Olympic shooters of Germany
Shooters at the 1912 Summer Olympics
Sportspeople from Hanover